The 2021 Premier Volleyball League (PVL) season was the fourth season of the Premier Volleyball League (17th season of the former Shakey's V-League) and the first season of the PVL as a professional league. No tournament was held in 2020 due to the COVID-19 pandemic and the 2021 season was staged with precautionary measures.

Changes

Professional status
The Games and Amusements Board in October 2020 issued a directive that it would consider players compensated for non-national team play would be considered as professionals, as well as that for all sporting events organized for profit as professional in nature. This has raised concerns over the status of semi-professional leagues such as the PVL and its rival league, the PSL. The PVL in particular was concerned over financial aspects of running as a professional league.

In November 2020, the PVL announced that the league would turn professional starting the 2021 season, believing it has enough women players to make the move. The league was already considering to turn professional due to the collegiate league UAAP deciding to bar its rookies from playing in commercial leagues starting its UAAP Season 81 (2018–19), in anticipation that all college players would not be allowed to play in the PVL. Prior to the league's professionalization, the PVL was considered as semi-professional and thus its affairs are not supervised or regulated by GAB Six PVL teams - BaliPure, Banko Perlas, Choco Mucho, Creamline, Motolite and Petro Gazz - agreed with the move for PVL to turn professional.

A new separate league called the V-League, in reference to the PVL's old name, will be formed to accommodate collegiate and amateur teams which could no longer take part in the PVL due to the league's professionalization. Prior to the PVL's professionalization, it has hosted the collegiate conference.

Impact of the COVID-19 pandemic
Due to the COVID-19 pandemic, the Premier Volleyball League had to secure permit from the Inter-Agency Task Force for the Management of Emerging Infectious Diseases (IATF-EID) of the Philippine national government to host games.

The Open conference, the only tournament of the 2021 season, was held under a "bubble" format with players and staff isolated at the playing venue.

The PVL planned to organize at least two conferences, with the second being the Reinforced Conference which allows teams to field foreign players. It was initially cancelled for the 2021 season by May 2021 due to logistical issues of bringing in foreign players due to pandemic-related travel restrictions as well as to accommodate the Philippine women's national team's preparation and participation in the 2021 Southeast Asian Games and the 2021 Asian Women's Volleyball Championship Both tournaments were later postponed to next year. The conduct of a second conference was again considered after the conclusion of the Open Conference. However such plans were again cancelled.

Open conference

Participating teams

Preliminary round

Final round

Awards

Final standings

Player of the week

References 

2021 in Philippine sport

Premier, 2021